Groat Road is a major roadway in Edmonton, Alberta. It is named after Malcolm Groat, a former Hudson's Bay Company employee who settled in the present-day Groat Estates area in the 1880s. Groat Road is part of a  continuous roadway that runs through Sherwood Park, Edmonton, and St. Albert that includes Wye Road, Sherwood Park Freeway, Whyte Avenue, portions of University Avenue and Saskatchewan Drive, and St. Albert Trail. Groat Road functions as a grade-separated parkway between 87 Avenue and 111 Avenue.

Groat Road begins at the roundabout west of the University of Alberta at 87 Avenue, where it continues south as Saskatchewan Drive. It continues north with a  speed limit and descends into the North Saskatchewan River valley, crossing the North Saskatchewan River along the Groat Bridge. The Groat Road designation ends at signalised traffic circle at 118 Avenue, continuing north as St. Albert Trail. Heavy trucks are prohibited  on Groat Road south of 107 Avenue.

Because of their short lengths, Wayne Gretzky Drive and Groat Road are the only freeways in Edmonton not to have a highway designation.

Neighbourhoods
List of neighbourhoods Groat Road runs through, in order from south to north.
Windsor Park
Glenora
Westmount
North Glenora
Inglewood
Woodcroft

Major intersections
This is a list of major intersections, starting at the south end of Groat Road.

See also 

 Transportation in Edmonton

References

Groat
Roads in Edmonton